Mary Maxim is the largest privately held craft and needlework mail-order company in North America. It has offices in Port Huron, Michigan, and Paris, Ontario, as well as a retail location in London, Ontario. It specializes in selling crafts, knitting and other hobby related items.

History

Mary Maxim's roots can be traced back to Sifton, Manitoba, Canada, where Willard and Olive McPhedrain purchased Spinwell Manufacturing Co who had been manufacturing and selling spinning wheels. Willard soon began a mail order company titled "Sifton Products."  In 1954 Willard began to search for new locations for his business and ended up in Paris, Ontario. The name was changed to Mary Maxim, after a store employee: Mary Maximchuk. Willard decided to take Betty Crocker's example by naming the company after a girl who helped around the household. Mary's name was shortened and the store name: Mary Maxim, was born. In 1956 after recognizing the customer potential in the United States, Willard's son Larry established an office in Port Huron, Michigan.

Mary Maxim was first recognized for their quality knitting yarns. In the late 1950s they became increasingly popular for their bulky, knit sweaters with designs influenced by North American Wildlife. The first sweater pattern was designed in 1951 by Stella Sawchyn.

Celebrity attention

Bob Hope was photographed wearing a Mary Maxim totem pole design sweater in 1953 while visiting Canada.
The Barenaked Ladies wore Mary Maxim Sweaters on their 2004 holiday album.
Miss Outdoors 1957 was photographed wearing a Mary Maxim sweater.
Angela Lansbury as Jessica Fletcher wore a Mary Maxim sweater in Episode 2 of the first series of Murder, She Wrote.

Mary Maxim today

Currently, Mary Maxim employs over 120 people in the Port Huron area and 60 people in Paris, Ontario. Ontario accounts for 15% sales from retail stores and 85% from the catalog division.

Mary Maxim has looked to the internet to increase profits. They can attribute 25% of their sales to internet selling.

Mary Maxim is now owned by the third generation of McPhedrains: Rusty and Jane. Rusty became vice president of operations in 1987 and president in 1995. Mary Maxim celebrated their 50th anniversary in June 2006.

References

External links
Official American site
Official Canadian site
Vancouver Observer article on history of Mary Maxim

Clothing companies of Canada